Ottorino Celli (born 1890) was an Italian cyclist. He rode in the 1909 Giro d'Italia.

References

External links
 

1890 births
Year of death missing
Italian male cyclists
Cyclists from Rome